Ian Alexander McFarland (born 1963) is an American Lutheran theologian and has since 2019 served as Robert W. Woodruff Professor of Theology at Emory University's Candler School of Theology, where he also taught from 2005 to 2015. From 2015 to 2019 he was the Regius Professor of Divinity at the University of Cambridge. He holds degrees from Trinity College (Hartford), Union Theological Seminary (New York), the Lutheran School of Theology at Chicago, the University of Cambridge and Yale University. He also taught at the University of Aberdeen from 1998 to 2005.

McFarland is editor of the Scottish Journal of Theology, a former fellow of Selwyn College, and a member of the Evangelical Lutheran Church in America (ELCA).  He has served as one of the ELCA representatives on rounds 12 and 13 of the US Lutheran–Catholic Dialogue.  His books include The Word Made Flesh: A Theology of the Incarnation (2019), From Nothing: A Theology of Creation (2014), In Adam's Fall: A Meditation on the Christian Doctrine of Original Sin (2010), and The Divine Image: Envisioning the Invisible God (2005).

Personal life 
Dr. McFarland is married to oboist Ann Lillya, with whom he has two daughters.

Publications

Books 
The Word Made Flesh: A Theology of the Incarnation. Westminster John Knox Press, 2019

From Nothing: A Theology of Creation. Westminster John Knox, 2014

Co-editor,The Cambridge Dictionary of Christian Theology. Cambridge University Press, 2011

In Adam's Fall: A Meditation on the Christian Doctrine of Original Sin. Wiley-Blackwell, 2010

Editor,Creation and Humanity. Westminster John Knox Press, 2009

The Divine Image: Envisioning the Invisible God. Fortress Press, 2005

Difference and Identity: A Theological Anthropology. Pilgrim Press, 2001

Listening to the Least: Doing Theology from the Outside In. Pilgrim Press, 1998

Chapters and articles 
"Sin and the Limits of Theology: A Reflection in Conversation with Julian of Norwich and Martin Luther," in International Journal of Systematic Theology 22/2 (April 2020): 147-168.

"Being Perfect: A Lutheran Perspective on Moral Formation," in Studies in Christian Ethics 33/1 (2019): 15-26.

"The Gift of the Non aliud: Creation from Nothing as a Metaphysics of Abundance," in International Journal of Systematic Theology 21/1 (January 2019): 44-58.

''The Upward Call': The Category of Vocation and the Oddness of Human Nature," in The Christian Doctrine of Humanity , Zondervan, 2018

"The Problem with Evil," Theology Today 74/4. January 01, 2019

"Present in Love: Rethinking Barth on the Divine Perfections," Modern Theology 33/2. April 01, 2017

"Original Sin," in the T&T Clark Companion to the Doctrine of Sin. Bloomsbury T & T Clark, 2016

"What Does It Mean To See Someone? Icons and Identity," in The Image of God in an Image-Driven Age: Explorations in Theological Anthropology. Intervarsity Press, 2016

"'Always and Everywhere': Divine Presence and the Incarnation," in The Gift of Theology: The Contribution of Kathryn Tanner. Fortress, 2015

"Theology of the Will," in The Oxford Handbook of Maximus the Confessor. Oxford University Press, 2015

"The Saving God," in Sanctified by Grace. Bloomsbury, 2014

"Spirit and Incarnation: Toward a Pneumatic Chalcedonianism," in International Journal of Systematic Theology, 16:2. April 01, 2014

References

External links
 Amazon.com list of McFarland's published books

1963 births
20th-century American theologians
20th-century Lutherans
20th-century Protestant theologians
21st-century American theologians
21st-century Lutherans
21st-century Protestant theologians
Academic journal editors
Academics of the University of Aberdeen
American evangelicals
American Lutheran theologians
Emory University faculty
Evangelical Lutheran Church in America Christians
Fellows of Selwyn College, Cambridge
Regius Professors of Divinity (University of Cambridge)
Living people
Lutheran School of Theology at Chicago alumni
People in Christian ecumenism
Systematic theologians
Trinity College (Connecticut) alumni
Union Theological Seminary (New York City) alumni
Yale University alumni
21st-century American non-fiction writers